The UK Memory of the World Register is part of the Memory of the World Programme.

The UK Register recognises documentary heritage of outstanding importance to the UK. Any documentary heritage can be nominated in a biennial application process.  The applications are assessed by a panel of experts in the care and use of documentary heritage and successful nominations are ‘inscribed’ onto the Register.  This recognition by UNESCO helps to raise the profile of the individual subscriptions which in turn can lead to additional funding, public recognition and use. The Programme generally raises awareness of the importance of caring for and providing access to documentary heritage.

See also
Memory of the World Register – Europe and North America for UK documents on the international list

Notes

External links
UK Memory of the World Register

Memory of the World Register
Memory of the World Register
2009 establishments in the United Kingdom